This article contains information about the literary events and publications of 1627.

Events
January 1 – Menasseh Ben Israel, founder of the first Hebrew printing press in Amsterdam, produces its first publication, a Spanish rite prayer book.

New books

Prose
Francis Bacon (died 1626) – Sylva Sylvarum, or A Natural History and New Atlantis
Jean-Pierre Camus – Hyacinthe
George Hakewill – An Apologie or Declaration of the Power and Providence of God
Marin Mersenne – Traité de l'harmonie universelle
Honoré d'Urfé (died 1625) – L'Astrée (completed)

New drama
William Davenant – The Cruel Brother
William Hawkins – Apollo Shroving
Philip Massinger – The Great Duke of Florence
Thomas Vincent – Paria (in Latin)

Poetry

Michael Drayton – miscellaneous poems, including The Battle of Agincourt, First Steps up Parnassus, and Nymphidia
Phineas Fletcher – Locustae, vel Pietas Jesuitica (in Latin and English)

Births
August 8 – Joseph Moxon, English printer and lexicographer (died 1691)
September 27 – Jacques-Bénigne Bossuet, French theologian (died 1704)
November 29 – John Ray, English naturalist (died 1705)
Unknown dates
John Flavel, English religious writer and Presbyterian minister (died 1691)
Dorothy Osborne, English literary correspondent (died 1695)

Deaths
April 12 (burial) – John Minsheu, English linguist and lexicographer (born 1560)
April 19 – John Beaumont, English dramatist and poet (born 1583)
May 24 – Luis de Góngora, Spanish lyric poet (born 1561)
June 22 – Lawrence Beyerlinck, Flemish theologian and encyclopedist (born 1578)
June 27 – John Hayward, English historian (born c.1560)
July 4 (burial) – Thomas Middleton, English dramatist and poet (born 1580)
September 20 – Jan Gruter, Flemish critic (born 1560)
September 29 – Johannes Acronius, Dutch theologian (born 1565)
October – Bernardo de Balbuena, Spanish-born Latin American poet (born 1561)
December – Henry Condell, English actor, co-compiler of the First Folio (date of birth unknown)

References

 
Years of the 17th century in literature